Joan "Chichi" Creus Molist (born November 24, 1956) is a Spanish former basketball player who played as point guard.

Professional career
Creus spent his entire 25-year career in Catalonia. He mainly played in Granollers EB, with a two-year period with FC Barcelona, where he won one National League and two National Cups.

In 1993, after the dissolution of Granollers, Creus signed with TDK Manresa. He led the club to win the two only championships in its history: the 1996 Copa del Rey and the Liga ACB in the 1997–98, considered one of the biggest miracles in the history of Spanish basketball. Creus was named MVP of both competitions.

In 1999, Creus announced his retirement. He is considered a historic player of the Liga ACB after playing 20,211 minutes in 585 games, scoring 7,929 points, and assisting 1,461 times in the league.

Spain national team
Creus joined the Spain national team for playing the EuroBasket 1983, where the team holds the silver medal, and the 1986 FIBA World Championship.

After retirement

After his retirement, Creus became on 2002 assistant coach of the Spain national team, achieving a gold medal in the 2006 FIBA World Championship and two silver medals in the EuroBasket 2003 and 2007.

He left the national team 2008, for becoming the general manager of the basketball team of FC Barcelona. Eight years later, in June 2016, Creus resigned.

Personal life
His son, Joan, is also a basketball player. In 2015, he played in ACB with CB Estudiantes.

Honors

With Manresa
Liga ACB: (1) 1998
Copa del Rey: (1) 1996

With Barcelona
Liga Nacional: (1) 1981
Copa del Rey: (2) 1981, 1982

References

External links 
 ACB Profile 
 Profile at Spain national basketball team website 

1956 births
Living people
Bàsquet Manresa players
Basketball players from Catalonia
CB L'Hospitalet players
FC Barcelona Bàsquet players
Liga ACB players
Point guards
1986 FIBA World Championship players